Daniella Melo (born September 26, 1998) is an American powerlifter, who won List of world championships medalists in powerlifting (women) at 2018 IPF World Championship in Calgary. She was tied with Amanda Lawrence, but lost due to higher body weight (83.05 vs 83.55kg) at 2019 IPF World Championship. At the championship, she has set up new world record in bench press.

References

1998 births
Living people
American powerlifters
Female powerlifters